John Alexander Bell (1829 – 30 August 1901) was a pastoralist and Member of the Queensland Legislative Council.

Early life 
Bell was born in County Kildare, Ireland in 1829 to Thomas Bell and his wife Sarah (née Alexander). He arrived in Queensland with his family when he was still a baby and attended The King's School, Parramatta. In 1844, along with his father and brother Joshua Bell became owners of Jimbour Station and Cumkillenbar stations on the Darling Downs.

In 1847, he had married Frances Georgina Armstrong and together had three children.

Public life 
Bell was appointed to the Queensland Legislative Council on 26 September 1866 and resigned his seat on the 21 November 1872.

Later life 
Bell died in 1901 and was buried in Ipswich General Cemetery.

References

Members of the Queensland Legislative Council
1829 births
1901 deaths
Burials at Ipswich General Cemetery
People from County Kildare
19th-century Australian politicians
Pre-Separation Queensland